Non-Fiction is an album by American jazz pianist and composer Steve Kuhn recorded in 1978 and released on the ECM label.

Reception 
The AllMusic review by Scott Yanow gave the album 4 stars, calling it "An interesting set of inside/outside music with a bit more energy than the more stereotypical ECM set".

Track listing 
All compositions by Steve Kuhn except as indicated.
 "Firewalk" (Harvie Swartz) - 8:00 
 "Random Thoughts" - 8:08 
 "Dance with the Wind" (Swartz) - 5:48 
 "Fruit Fly" - 5:54 
 "Alias Dash Grapey" - 11:57
Recorded at Tonstudio Bauer in Ludwigsburg, West Germany in April 1978.

Personnel 
 Steve Kuhn - piano, percussion
 Steve Slagle - soprano saxophone, alto saxophone, flute, percussion
 Harvie Swartz - bass
 Bob Moses - drums

References 

ECM Records albums
Steve Kuhn albums
1978 albums
Albums produced by Manfred Eicher